The New Brunswick New Democratic Party held a leadership election, following the resignation of Allison Brewer, on November 6, 2006 subsequent to their previous convention on September 25, 2005.

The New Brunswick NDP is a social democratic political party in the Province of New Brunswick, Canada.

Members voted by mail or at a convention on October 13, 2007, where Roger Duguay was elected leader.

Candidates

The Telegraph-Journal reported on August 8, 2007 that there were two declared candidates upon the close of nominations.

Dennis Atchison, 50, candidate in Fredericton North in the 2003 election (placing third with 16.1%) and in Fredericton-Silverwood in 2006 (placing third with 11.6%).
Roger Duguay, 43, candidate in Miramichi Bay-Neguac in the 2006 election who finished third with 26.2% of the vote—the best showing of any NDP candidate in that election.

Despite earlier speculation, Yvon Godin, 51, federal Member of Parliament for Acadie-Bathurst since the 1997 election, did not enter the race.

Timeline
 November 5, 2006 - Allison Brewer resigns as leader.
 February, 2007 - The party council sets a date for a leadership vote.
 August, 2007, nominations close, Dennis Atchison and Roger Duguay are declared candidates.
 October 13, 2007 - Roger Duguay is elected leader at the convention. With only two candidates, organizers decide not to publicly release the actual vote totals that each candidate received.

See also
 1988 New Brunswick New Democratic Party leadership election
 2005 New Brunswick New Democratic Party leadership election
 2011 New Brunswick New Democratic Party leadership election
 2017 New Brunswick New Democratic Party leadership election
 2021 New Brunswick New Democratic Party leadership election

External links
NDP convention site
Atchison campaign site
Duguay campaign site

Notes

2007
2007 elections in Canada
2007 in New Brunswick
New Brunswick New Democratic Party leadership election